Kommunistisk Sammenslutning (marxister-leninister) (Communist Union (Marxist-Leninist)), a Marxist-Leninist group in Denmark that existed May–December 1978. KSML was formed through a split in Kommunistisk Arbejderparti (Communist Workers' Party). KSML held that the KAP had turned revisionist. KSML was staunchly pro-Albanian. The group was mainly based in Copenhagen.

KSML started publishing Arbejderen (The Worker).

In December 1978 KSML merged with another KAP-splinter group, Marxistisk-Leninistisk Forbund (Marxist-Leninist League), to form Danmarks Kommunistiske Parti/Marxister-Leninister (Communist Party of Denmark/Marxist-Leninist).

References

1978 establishments in Denmark
1978 disestablishments in Denmark
Defunct communist parties in Denmark
Political parties established in 1978
Political parties disestablished in 1978